The 2016–17 season was Juventus Football Club's 119th in existence and tenth consecutive season in the top flight of Italian football. Juventus re-designed their kit with a different take on the trademark white and black stripes in this season. On 26 July 2016, Juventus signing Gonzalo Higuaín became, at the time, the third highest football transfer of all-time and highest ever transfer for an Italian club, when he signed for €90 million from Napoli. On 8 August 2016, Paul Pogba returned to his first club, Manchester United, for an all-time record for highest football transfer fee at €105 million, surpassing the former record holder Gareth Bale.

On 17 May 2017, Juventus won their 12th Coppa Italia title in a 2–0 win over Lazio, becoming the first team to win three consecutive championships. Four days later on 21 May, following a 3–0 win over Crotone, Juventus secured their sixth consecutive Serie A title, establishing an all-time record of successive triumphs in the competition. On 3 June 2017, Juventus entered a second Champions League Final in three years, but were defeated 4–1 by defending champions Real Madrid. During a screening of the Champions League Final in Turin, a firecracker caused panic, and a subsequent stampede. One woman died, and at least 1,526 people were injured.

Players

Squad information
Players and squad numbers last updated on 25 May 2017.Note: Flags indicate national team as has been defined under FIFA eligibility rules. Players may hold more than one non-FIFA nationality.

Transfers

Summer 2016

In

Out

Other acquisitions

Other disposals

Total expenditure: €162,500,000

Total revenue: €163,700,000

Net income:  €1,200,000

Winter 2016–17

In

Out

Other acquisitions

Other disposals

Total expenditure: €29,000,000

Total revenue: €10,000,000

Net income:  €19,000,000

Summer 2017

In

Out

Other acquisitions

Other disposals

Pre-season and friendlies

Competitions

Supercoppa Italiana

Serie A

League table

Results summary

Results by round

Matches

Coppa Italia

UEFA Champions League

Group stage

Knockout phase

Round of 16

Quarter-finals

Semi-finals

Final

Statistics

Appearances and goals

|-
! colspan=14 style=background:#DCDCDC; text-align:center| Goalkeepers

|-
! colspan=14 style=background:#DCDCDC; text-align:center| Defenders

|-
! colspan=14 style=background:#DCDCDC; text-align:center| Midfielders

|-
! colspan=14 style=background:#DCDCDC; text-align:center| Forwards

|-
! colspan=14 style=background:#DCDCDC; text-align:center| Players transferred out during the season

Goalscorers

Last updated: 3 June 2017

Disciplinary record

Last updated: 3 June 2017

Notes

A.  The match was called at the 57th minute due to the annual tradition of pitch invasion.

References

Juventus F.C. seasons
Juventus
Juventus
Italian football championship-winning seasons